SMPTE 2022 is a standard from the Society of Motion Picture and Television Engineers (SMPTE) that describes how to send digital video over an IP network. Video formats supported include MPEG-2 and serial digital interface The standard was introduced in 2007 and has been expanded in the years since.

The standard is published in eight parts.
ST 2022-1:2007 - Forward Error Correction for Real-Time Video/Audio Transport Over IP Networks
ST 2022-2:2007 - Unidirectional Transport of Constant Bit Rate MPEG-2 Transport Streams on IP Networks
ST 2022-3:2010 - Unidirectional Transport of Variable Bit Rate MPEG-2 Transport Streams on IP Networks
ST 2022-4:2011 - Unidirectional Transport of Non-Piecewise Constant Variable Bit Rate MPEG-2 Streams on IP Networks
ST 2022-5:2013 - Forward Error Correction for Transport of High Bit Rate Media Signals over IP Networks (HBRMT)
ST 2022-6:2012 - Transport of High Bit Rate Media Signals over IP Networks (HBRMT)
ST 2022-7:2013 - Seamless Protection Switching of SMPTE ST 2022 IP Datagrams
ST 2022-8:2019 - SMPTE Standard - Professional Media Over Managed IP Networks: Timing of ST 2022-6 Streams in ST 2110-10 Systems 

SMPTE 2022 is an important technology enabling the transition of broadcast systems to IP networking.

High Bit Rate Media Transport
High Bit Rate Media Transport (HBRMT) formerly known as High Bit Rate Audio Video Over IP (HBRAV-IP), is a standard for data encapsulation and forward error correction (FEC) of high bit rate contribution oriented video/audio feed services, up to 3 Gbit/s over Ethernet networks. HBRMT is published as parts 5 and 6 of SMPTE 2022 by the SMPTE 32NF networking technology committee. HBRMT supports both SDI uncompressed and JPEG 2000 compressed video and audio formats.

See also
Audio over Ethernet
Audio over IP
Professional video over IP
SMPTE 2059
SMPTE 2110
Voice over Internet Protocol

References

External links
 Video Services Forum - HBRMT Encapsulation and FEC Committee

SMPTE standards